Carl Friedrich Petersen (6 July 1809 in Hamburg – 14 November 1892 in Hamburg) was a Hamburg lawyer and politician, who served several terms as First Mayor of Hamburg. He was a Hamburg senator from 1855 until his death.

Education and early career

He studied law at the University of Göttingen and at Heidelberg University, and earned a doctorate in 1830. After a stay in Paris, he became a burgher of Hamburg in 1831 and practised as a lawyer.

Public life

From the 1830s, he held numerous public offices, and he was elected as a senator in 1855. In 1861 he became First Lord of Police (i.e. Minister of Police and the Interior). He became First Mayor in 1876 and was reelected in the following year. He also served as Second and First Mayor during the terms 1879/80, 1882/83, 1885/86, 1888/89 and 1891/92.

Family
Two grandsons by his son Gustav Petersen, Carl Wilhelm Petersen and Rudolf Hieronymus Petersen, also officiated as first mayors of Hamburg, the former between 1924 and 1929 and again 1932 and 1933, the latter from 1945 to 1946.

References 

Mayors of Hamburg
Senators of Hamburg (before 1919)
University of Göttingen alumni
Heidelberg University alumni
Jurists from Hamburg
1809 births
1892 deaths
19th-century German lawyers